The Engstligen Falls near Adelboden in the Bernese Highlands consists of two waterfalls, Engstligen Fall I & II of heights of , and , respectively). They are listed in the Swiss Inventory of Landscapes of National Significance.

The Engstligen Falls have one of the highest water volumes of alpine waterfalls, and are one of Adelboden's attractions.

The upper falls can be partly seen from the Engstligenalp cable railway; a full view is possible from the mule track leading up the rocks.

The lower falls are accessible on an easy mountain path from the lower station of the Engstligenalp cable railway.

In winter, the Engstligen Falls are a paradise for ice climbers.

References

Bernese Oberland
Waterfalls of Switzerland
Adelboden
WEngstligen